Trinidad and Tobago competed at the 2017 World Championships in Athletics in London, United Kingdom, from 4–13 August 2017.

Medalists

* – Indicates the athlete competed in preliminaries but not the final

Results

Men
Track and road events

* – Indicates the athlete competed in preliminaries but not the final

Field events

Women
Track and road events

References

Nations at the 2017 World Championships in Athletics
World Championships in Athletics
Trinidad and Tobago at the World Championships in Athletics